The Remington 710 series is a descendant of the popular Remington 700 rifle, and was manufactured by Remington Arms from 2001 to 2006 at their manufacturing plant in Mayfield, Kentucky.

Based on the same principles as the Remington 700 series, the Model 710 uses a centerfire bolt-action cartridge, a 3-lug bolt system as opposed to the Remington 700's dual opposed locking lugs, with a 4-round detachable magazine (or a 3-round for the 7 mm Remington Magnum and the .300 Winchester Magnum). All can be equipped with a bipod and sling, and comes equipped with a gray or olive drab rugged all-weather synthetic stock, and a mounted Bushnell Sharpshooter, 3-9 × 40 scope which is bore-sighted from the factory. The Remington 710 is a moderately priced rifle. With the synthetic stock and the already mounted scope, it makes an adequate rifle for the novice shooter or hunter.

This particular model has been heavily criticized, however, because many of the polymer receiver which was replaced with a steel one in the final production year.

The Remington 710 was significantly improved by Remington and renamed the Remington 770.  The 710 model is now discontinued.

Recall
There was a recall for the Remington 710, between July and October 2002, for improperly made safety detent springs.
The Remington website provides a check for 710 owners to determine if they are affected.

References

External links
Remington Arms Website

Bolt-action rifles of the United States
Remington Arms firearms